Herminio Menéndez Rodríguez (born December 20, 1953) is a Spanish sprint canoer who competed from the early 1970s to the mid-1980s. Competing in four Summer Olympics, he won three medals with two silvers (1976: K-4 1000 m, 1980: K-2 500 m) and one bronze (1980: K-2 1000 m).

Menéndez also won eight medals at the ICF Canoe Sprint World Championships with a gold (K-4 1000 m: 1975), a silver (K-4 500 m: 1978), and six bronzes (K-1 4 x 500 m: 1975. K-2 1000 m: 1982, K-2 10000 m: 1979, K-4 500 m: 1977, K-4 1000 m: 1977, 1978).

References

1953 births
Canoeists at the 1972 Summer Olympics
Canoeists at the 1976 Summer Olympics
Canoeists at the 1980 Summer Olympics
Canoeists at the 1984 Summer Olympics
Living people
Olympic canoeists of Spain
Olympic silver medalists for Spain
Olympic bronze medalists for Spain
Spanish male canoeists
Olympic medalists in canoeing
ICF Canoe Sprint World Championships medalists in kayak
Real Grupo de Cultura Covadonga sportsmen
Medalists at the 1980 Summer Olympics
Medalists at the 1976 Summer Olympics
20th-century Spanish people